Piercetown may refer to the following places in Ireland:

Piercetown, County Wexford, a village in County Wexford
Piercetown, County Westmeath (civil parish), a civil parish in County Westmeath
Piercetown, County Westmeath (townland), a townland in the civil parish of Castlelost, County Westmeath

See also 
 Pierce Township (disambiguation)